is a Japanese term referring either to  cakes made of  or  cakes made from Lactobacillales-fermented wheat starch, a speciality dish local to certain wards of Tokyo, served chilled and topped with  and .

Add water and sugar to kuzu powder and cook it over a slow flame, stirring continuously till it thickens and becomes transparent. It also becomes elastic to the touch. The transparent appearance gives a cool impression, so it is often eaten especially in summer.

External links
 Kuzumochi, a cool sweet summer dessert. May 30, 2008.
 How to Make Kuzumochi. Setsuko Yoshizuka, About.com Guide. August 21, 2009.

Wagashi